Rubén López may refer to:

Rubén López Sabariego (1917-1961), Cuban bus driver who mysteriously disappeared and died
Rubén López (footballer) (born 1979), Spanish footballer
Rubén López (gymnast) (born 1990), Spanish gymnast